Khorramabad (also Romanized as Khorramābād) is a village in Hokmabad Rural District, Atamalek District, Jowayin County, Razavi Khorasan Province, Iran. At the 2006 census, its population was 1,479, in 372 families.

References 

Populated places in Joveyn County